Bambuyka is a rural locality (a settlement) in Muysky District, Republic of Buryatia, Russia. The population was 7 as of 2010.

Geography 
Bambuyka is located 77 km southeast of Taksimo (the district's administrative centre) by road.

References 

Rural localities in Muysky District